Nargis Sethi is a retired Pakistani civil service officer of the Pakistan Administrative Service who served in BPS-22 grade as the Cabinet Secretary of Pakistan and Principal Secretary to the Prime Minister of Pakistan. Other heavyweight assignments held by Sethi include Secretary for Water and Power, Secretary for Economic Affairs and Defence Secretary of Pakistan.

Sethi was promoted to the rank of Federal Secretary by Prime Minister Yousaf Raza Gillani in October 2010. After her retirement from the civil services, she was appointed as member of the Federal Public Service Commission.

Education
Sethi holds post-graduate degrees in international relations from Karachi University, defence studies from Quaid-e-Azam University, and a Master of Science in Development Administration from a university in the  United States.

Personal life
Sethi is married to Saleem Sethi who is also a retired senior civil service officer.

She was the first woman in the country's history to be posted as Principal Secretary to the Prime Minister.

Awards and recognition
Sitara-i-Imtiaz (Star of Excellence) Award by the President of Pakistan in 2012

See also
Nasir Mahmood Khosa
Jawad Rafique Malik
Rizwan Ahmed
Tariq Bajwa
Rabiya Javeri Agha
Fawad Hassan Fawad
Syed Abu Ahmad Akif
Tasneem Noorani

References

Pakistani civil servants
Defence Secretaries of Pakistan
Living people
Year of birth missing (living people)
Principal Secretary to the Prime Minister of Pakistan